Mount Pleasant Methodist Church is historic Methodist church in Waldron, Arkansas.  It is a single-story wood-frame structure, originally built in 1891 on land donated by Joseph Self, a locally prominent farmer.  The church is finished in weatherboard, and has a steeply pitched gable roof, with a bell tower at the front (north) end.  A shed-roof addition extends to the south (rear) of the building.  The interior features a distinctive gambrel ceiling, finished in flush pine boards painted white.

The building was listed on the National Register of Historic Places in 1986.

See also
National Register of Historic Places listings in Scott County, Arkansas

References

Methodist churches in Arkansas
Churches on the National Register of Historic Places in Arkansas
Churches completed in 1891
Buildings and structures in Scott County, Arkansas
National Register of Historic Places in Scott County, Arkansas